Edward Degener (October 20, 1809 – September 11, 1890) was a German-born American politician. He was a Republican U.S. Representative from Texas during the Reconstruction era.

Originally from Germany, Degener moved to the United States and lived in Texas. During the American Civil War, slave-holding Texas joined the Confederacy, but Degener remained loyal to the Union, and was persecuted by the Confederates for this loyalty to the U.S. Two of Degener's sons were murdered by the Confederates in the Nueces massacre. After the war ended, Degener served as a Republican congressman for the Texan 4th Congressional District and as a San Antonio city council member in the 1870s. He died in 1890.

Early life and education
Born in Brunswick in the Kingdom of Prussia (now Germany), Degener pursued an academic course in Germany and in England. He was twice a member of the legislative body in Anhalt-Dessau and was a member of the first German National Assembly at Frankfurt-am-Main in 1848.

He immigrated to the United States in 1850 and settled in Sisterdale, Texas, in the Texas Hill Country west of San Antonio, with its burgeoning German immigrant population. Degener engaged in agricultural pursuits.

Career

American Civil War
During the U.S. Civil War, civilian Degener was arrested by the Confederate army and charged with being "a dangerous and seditious person and an enemy to the government." Degener had allegedly criticized the Confederacy, corresponded with alleged enemies of same, and failed to report known Union sympathizers. Degener pleaded not guilty. His legal counsel challenged the legal authority of the military, and the charge of sedition, which was not a crime legally recognized by the government.  Found guilty anyway, he was ordered to post a bond of $5,000 that he would be loyal to the Confederacy.

Degener's sons Hugo and Hilmar died during the Nueces massacre when they were murdered by the Confederates. To honor their memory, Degener along with Eduard Steves and William Heuermann, purchased land for the establishment of the German-language Treue der Union Monument, which became part of the National Register of Historic Places listings in Texas November 29, 1978.

Politics
Degener served as member of the Texas constitutional conventions in 1866 and 1868, and served on the Committee for Immigration along with fellow committee members Julius Scheutze, H.H. Foster, George W. Smith, Erwin Wilson, John Morse and Stephen Curtis (the lone black man on the committee).

Upon the readmission of the State of Texas to representation was elected as a Republican to the Forty-first Congress and served from March 31, 1870, to March 3, 1871. Degener was an unsuccessful candidate for reelection in 1870 to the Forty-second Congress.

He served as member of the city council of San Antonio, Texas from 1872 to 1878.

Later life and death
Degener died in San Antonio on September 11, 1890. He was interred in the San Antonio City Cemetery No. 1.

See also

References

Further reading

 Handbook of Texas Online, Texas State Historical Association.

External links

1809 births
1890 deaths
German emigrants to the Republic of Texas
German emigrants to the United States
Politicians from Braunschweig
People from the Duchy of Brunswick
Businesspeople from Texas
Burials at San Antonio City Cemetery No. 1
San Antonio City Council members
Republican Party members of the United States House of Representatives from Texas
Southern Unionists in the American Civil War
19th-century American politicians
19th-century American businesspeople